Georgio Allentini, born George Allen (born 1966), better known by the stage name and mononym Georgio, is an American funk and dance music singer, songwriter and multi-instrumentalist based in California. Allentini also produced, directed and starred in the film Tapped Out in 2003.

Music career
After giving his demos to Prince in a bid to join Prince's Paisley Park, he recorded his own track "Sexappeal" (sometimes "Sex Appeal") on his own Georgio Records. "A lot of people in Los Angeles just gave me the run- around and didn't want to make a commitment." Allentini stated.

In 1984, Motown Records showed interest in Allentini and he was eventually signed to the label. Said Motown's then-vice-president of A&R Russ Regan "I heard Sexappeal for myself on my car radio one day and felt it was a record Motown had to go after, but I wanted to meet the artist first. I didn't want to buy just a record. We had dinner and I got excited. There was just something about him."

In 1987, Allentini had several songs charting on the Billboard Hot 100, although none climbed any higher than number 58. He was much more successful on the Hot Dance Music/Club Play chart, where he earned four Top 10 hits, including "Tina Cherry" which went to number  1. His 1988 release, "Lover's Lane" reached number 54 in the UK Singles Chart. 

Allentini recorded two albums on Motown Records in the 1980s and one on RCA Records in the 1990s. He also worked at MIG Records.

Film career
Georgio made the transition to filmmaker with the 2003 release of Tapped Out, which starred Coolio, Alex Avant and Jimmy Bridges. The film was written, co-produced and co-directed by Allentini, who also composed music for its soundtrack.

Allentini also appeared in the 2000 French documentary entitled XX elles with Estelle Desanges, Lisa Guerlain, Dany Verissimo-Petit and others.

Personal life
Allentini was born in Texas in 1966. His mother was a retail salesperson, his father a Naval officer. Georgio moved to Los Angeles at age 17. He is married to actress Kelly Jo Minter.

Discography

Albums
1987: Sex Appeal (Motown Records)
1988: Georgio (Motown Records)
1991: Rollin'  (RCA)

Singles
(Selective)
1987: "Sexappeal" or "Sex Appeal" number 58 US number 16 R&B
1987: "Tina Cherry" number 96 US number 5 R&B
1987: "I Won't Change"
1987: "Lover's Lane" number 59 US number 26 R&B
1988: "Bedrock" number 37 R&B
1988: "I Don't Want 2 Be Alone" 	 	 
1989: "Car Freak"
1989: "Romantic Love"

Filmography

Director
2003: Tapped Out (also as producer / screenwriter / actor / composer of soundtrack)

See also
List of number-one dance hits (United States)
List of artists who reached number one on the US Dance chart

References

Motown artists
African-American musicians
American dance musicians
American funk musicians
American rhythm and blues musicians
Living people
American DJs
1966 births
21st-century African-American people
20th-century African-American people